HMS Shoreham was a  of the British Royal Navy. She was the fifth vessel to bear the name. From 2018 to 2021, Shoreham was deployed at UKNSF Bahrain together with three other mine countermeasures ships as part of 9 Mine Countermeasures Squadron on Operation Kipion. In 2022 she was decommissioned and is to be transferred to Ukraine.

Operational history

2001–2010
Shoreham was accepted into service on 28 November 2001 and commissioned in a ceremony in her namesake port on 20 July 2002.

2011–present
In 2012, Shoreham deployed to the Persian Gulf to join the 9th Mine Countermeasures squadron based in Bahrain. She returned to Faslane on 28 August 2015 after three years away.

Shoreham entered refit in Rosyth in 2016 for repair work to her hull. Other work carried out included installing a new galley, fitting a new fire detection system and improving the high-pressure air system. She was handed back to the Royal Navy in January 2017.

In spring 2017, Shoreham deployed with NATO Mine Countermeasures Group 1 (SNMCMG1), operating around Northern Europe. During the course of this deployment Shoreham, the last of the Sandown class to be built, took part in naval exercises with the former , now operated by the Estonian Navy as Admiral Cowan.

In August 2021, Shoreham returned to the U.K having been relieved by her sister ship .

In May 2022, Shoreham embarked on a final short tour of the UK ahead of her planned decommissioning including a final visit to her namesake port during which 1,500 members of the public toured the ship.

In September 2022, she was spotted operating around Firth of Forth carrying the name "Черкаси" and the pennant number M311. Though still reportedly in commission with the Royal Navy, she was now training sailors of the Ukrainian Navy prior to her planned handover to that Navy. In October 2022 it was reported that she had been decommissioned.

References

External links 

 

Sandown-class minehunters
Ships built in Southampton
2001 ships
Minehunters of the United Kingdom